Richard Cheslyn (17 December 1797 – 29 December 1858) was an English amateur cricketer who played first-class cricket from 1825 to 1846.  He was mainly associated with Sussex and Marylebone Cricket Club (MCC), of which he was a member.  He made 10 known appearances in first-class matches including one for Sussex in the second of the roundarm trial matches in 1827.

References

1797 births
1858 deaths
English cricketers
English cricketers of 1787 to 1825
English cricketers of 1826 to 1863
Sussex cricketers
Marylebone Cricket Club cricketers
People from North West Leicestershire District
Cricketers from Leicestershire
North v South cricketers
Non-international England cricketers
Lord Strathavon's XI cricketers